Pelham Crescent is a circa 1825 Georgian crescent of houses in South Kensington, London SW7, England, designed by architect George Basevi. Numbers 1–14 and 15–27 are separately Grade II* listed.

The selling of garden keys to the residents of Pelham Crescent funds the maintenance of the garden. The lessees of 1-27 Pelham Crescent and 1-29 and 2-18 Pelham Place had access to the gardens as a right of their leases until the leases expirations in 1932. The freehold of the garden is owned by the Smith's Charity Estate (now owned by the Wellcome Trust).

The average value of a house on the mews was £7.3 million in 2020.

Actor-manager Nigel Playfair's former residence at No. 26 is marked by a London County Council blue plaque erected in 1965 and Francois Guizot's former home at 21 is commemorated by an English Heritage blue plaque placed in 2001.

Notable residents
No. 7 — Edward John Trelawny, poet, 1861 to 1881
No. 10 — Robert and Mary Anne Keeley, actors
No. 11 — George Godwin the elder, architect
No. 21  — François Guizot, politician and author
No. 22 — Moses Margoliouth, Hebrew scholar and Christian convert from Judaism, later Georges d'Oultremont and Baron Jean de Blommaert,  Belgian Army officers and resistance organisers in World War II
No. 25 — Charles James Mathews, actor and impresario from 1865 to 1870
No. 26 — Nigel Playfair, actor-manager

The publisher Max Reinhardt lived in Pelham Crescent for 25 years.

References

External links
LondonGardensOnline - Pelham Crescent

1825 establishments in England
Communal gardens
Garden squares in London
George Basevi buildings
Grade II* listed houses in London
Houses completed in 1825
Houses in the Royal Borough of Kensington and Chelsea
South Kensington